The 49th G7 summit will be held from 19 to 21 May 2023 in Hiroshima, Chūgoku, Hiroshima Prefecture, Japan.

Leaders at the summit 
The 2023 summit will be the first summit for British Prime Minister Rishi Sunak and Italian Prime Minister Giorgia Meloni.

Participants and representatives

Expected participating leaders

Invited guests

Events leading to the summit 
On 18 February 2023, the first of a series of G7 Foreign Ministers' Meeting was held in Germany with the participation of the Foreign Minister of Ukraine expected.

On 24 February 2023, one year since Russia's aggression began, the G7 Leaders' Video Conference was held. After the opening remarks by Prime Minister Kishida as the Chair and a statement by Volodymyr Zelenskyy, President of Ukraine, the G7 Leaders had a discussion. The G7 Leaders' Statement was released after the meeting.

On 19 March 2023, the G7 Foreign Ministers condemned in the strongest terms North Korea's launch of yet another Intercontinental Ballistic Missile (ICBM) on 16th, which undermines regional and international peace and security.

From 16 to 18 April 2023, the second G7 Foreign Ministers' Meeting will be held in Karuizawa, Nagano.

See also 
 2023 G20 New Delhi summit

Reference list

External links 

Official website

2023 conferences
2023 in international relations
21st-century diplomatic conferences (Global)
Diplomatic conferences in Japan
2023
May 2023 events in Japan